Qaleh-ye Seyyed (also Romanized as Qal‘eh-ye Seyyed) is a village in Howmeh-ye Sharqi Rural District, in the Central District of Ramhormoz County, Khuzestan Province, Iran. At the 2006 census, its population was 50, in 12 families.

References 

Populated places in Ramhormoz County